On Tour is a song by Australian hip hop trio Bliss n Eso. It was released 12 June 2009 through Illusive Sounds. The song appeared on the live album Flying Colours Live, as a bonus track. The song peaked at No. 76 on the ARIA Singles Chart.

Content
The song opens with Bliss yelling to Eso from his car that they are going to be late for a flight. In the song Bliss n Eso describe life on tour.

Chart performance
The song spent a total of two weeks on the ARIA Singles Chart. It song debuted and peaked at No. 76 on the chart, the following week it dropped to No. 84 and then fell off the chart.

Charts

References

Bliss n Eso songs
2009 songs
2009 singles
Illusive Sounds singles